Live at the Beverly Theater is a live album by the P-Funk All-Stars. It was recorded at the Beverly Theatre in California on April 23 and 24 of 1983 and was originally broadcast by the Westwood One radio network. 

Prince claimed that he attended one of the shows, which inspired him to record "Erotic City". Live at the Beverly Theater was released by Westbound Records in 1990.

Two songs broadcast by Westwood One were not included on Live at the Beverly Theater: "Standing on the Verge of Getting It On" and "Loopzilla." Bootsy Collins performed the song "Body Slam" at the concert, but it was neither broadcast nor was it included on the album.

The cover of Live at the Beverly Theater features artwork from longtime P-Funk album artist Pedro Bell.

Track listing
"P-Funk (Wants to Get Funked Up)" – 2:16 (In the record SIDE-ONE)
"Do That Stuff" – 10:52
"Cosmic Slop" – 10:11
"Let's Take It to the Stage Medley" – 8:38 (In the record SIDE-TWO)
A)"Let's Take It to the Stage"
B)"Mothership Connection" (starchild)
C)”I Call My Baby Pussy Cat” 
"Give Up the Funk (Tear the Roof off the Sucker)" – 12:48
"(Not Just) Knee Deep" – 12:54 (In the record SIDE-THREE)
"Maggot Brain" – 16:49
"One Nation Under a Groove" – 9:06
"Atomic Dog" – 9:58 (In the record SIDE-FOUR)
"Flash Light" – 4:59

Personnel
Rodney "Skeet" Curtis - bass
Michael Hampton, Garry Shider, Eddie Hazel, Cordell Mosson, DeWayne "Blackbyrd" McKnight - guitar
Dennis Chambers - drums
Benny Cowan (trumpet), Greg Thomas (saxophone), and Greg Boyer (trombone) - horns
Bernie Worrell, Jerome Rogers - keyboards
George Clinton, Garry Shider, Lige Curry, Gary "Mudbone" Cooper, Robert "P-Nut" Johnson, Michael "Clip" Payne, Ron Ford - vocals
Maceo Parker - MC

References

P-Funk albums
1990 live albums